Acleris foliana is a species of moth of the family Tortricidae. It is found in North America, where it has been recorded from Arizona, California, Colorado, Utah and Wyoming.

The wingspan is 16–18 mm. Adults have been recorded on wing from May to August.

The larvae feed on Cercocarpus betuloides, Cercocarpus ledifolius and Cercocarpus montanus.

References

Moths described in 1879
foliana
Moths of North America